The Angels Greatest is the first greatest hits album by Australian hard rock group, The Angels, released in May 1980. It peaked at No. 5 on the Kent Music Report Albums Chart. It was the group's final released on Albert Productions.

Track listing

Personnel 
The Angels – producers
Vanda & Young – producers (consultants)
 Mark Opitz – producer, engineer
 Doc Neeson – vocals
Chris Bailey – bass
Graham "Buzz" Bidstrup – vocals, drums
Rick Brewster – vocals, lead guitar
John Brewster – vocals, rhythm guitar

Charts

Certifications

References

1980 greatest hits albums
The Angels (Australian band) compilation albums
Albums produced by Harry Vanda
Albums produced by George Young (rock musician)
Albert Productions compilation albums